Anna Maria Földényi (born 22 August 1974) is a former professional tennis player from Hungary.

In her career, Földényi won 13 singles and three doubles titles on the ITF Women's Circuit. On 27 September 1999, she reached her best singles ranking of world No. 107. On 19 April 1999, she peaked at No. 142 in the doubles rankings.

Playing for Hungary Fed Cup team, she has a win-loss record of 19–5.

Földényi retired from tour in 2007.

WTA career finals

Doubles: 1 (runner-up)

ITF finals

Singles: 18 (13–5)

Doubles: 3 (3–0)

External links
 
 
 

Hungarian female tennis players
German female tennis players
1974 births
Living people
German people of Hungarian descent
Sportspeople from Düsseldorf
Tennis people from North Rhine-Westphalia